Josiah Makoela (born 3 July 1991) is a South African DJ and record producer commonly known as Josiah De Disciple. He is best known for his time with the Amapiano DJ duo, JazziDisciples, alongside Mr JazziQ. The duo split in 2018 to focus on their individual music careers.

He released his debut studio album Spirits of Makoela, Vol. 2: The Reintroduction, after Mr JazziQ's album Party with the English, which resulted in comparison between the record producers' projects.

His single "Mama", with Boohle from their collaborative album Umbuso Wabam'nyama, was certified gold by the Recording Industry of South Africa (RiSA).

Discography 
Studio albums
 

Collaborative albums

References 

 
 

1991 births
Living people
South African DJs
South African record producers
South African musicians
Amapiano musicians
People from Alexandra, Gauteng
People from Johannesburg
Sotho people 
People from Gauteng